Kushneria aurantia is a Gram-negative, aerobic, non-spore-forming, rod-shaped and moderately halophilic bacterium from the genus of Kushneria which has been isolated from the surface of leaves from the mangrove Avicennia germinans.

References

Oceanospirillales
Bacteria described in 2009